Selenariidae is a family of bryozoans belonging to the order Cheilostomatida.

Genera:
 Pseudolunularia Cadée, Chimonides & Cook, 1989
 Selenaria Busk, 1854

References

Cheilostomatida